Hakkı Behiç Bayiç (1886 – 12 October 1943) was a Turkish politician, who served as a secretary in the Turkish Communist Party founded by Atatürk.

References 

1886 births
1943 deaths
Politicians from Istanbul
Republican People's Party (Turkey) politicians
20th-century Turkish politicians